Air Vice-Marshal Michael John O'Brian (Urdu: مايكل او براءين; born: 5 January 1928 – 8 June 2002) was an air officer in the Pakistan Air Force (PAF) who served as the Commandant of National Defence University, Islamabad. O'Brian was the first Pakistan Air Force officer to serve as the Commandant of the university. He also served as the Deputy Chief of Air Staff, and was one of the distinguished Christian pilots who participated in Indo-Pakistan wars of 1947, 1965, and the 1971.

Early life
Born into a South Asian Christian family in Lahore, O'Brian enlisted in the Royal Indian Air Force in 1946. O'Brian studied in Forman Christian College He opted for Pakistani citizenship in 1947, and actively participated in Indo-Pakistani War of 1947. After the war, O'Brian pursued his BSc in mathematics in Forman Christian College in 1948. O'Brian is a graduate of Pakistan Air Force Academy's College of Flying Training where he gained a [[BS in Aviation Sciences, also receiving a Certified Diploma in Flying from the Flying Instructors School. O'Brian holds a MSc in Military Science and an honorary PhD in War studies from National Defence University, Islamabad.

Military career

O'Brian was one of the distinguished and pioneering PAF fighter pilots who participated in the Indo-Pakistani wars of 1947, 1965, and 1971. A fighter pilot, O'Brian played an important role in setting up the training institutes within the Pakistan Air Force. He was promoted to Air Vice Marshal in 1969, and led military missions in the Indo-Pakistani War of 1971. After the war O'Brian achieved the penultimate position in PAF and served as the Deputy Chief of Air Staff. Air Vice Marshal O'Brian also achieved a rare distinction as having been the only PAF Officer to serve as the Commandant of National Defence College. 

In 1974, O'Brian was given command of Sargodha Air Force base. O'Brian played an important and significant role in the up-grading of the facility. He also supervised the nuclear test sites near Kirana Hills, and personally oversaw the construction of the test site. O'Brian was a senior member of the military unit Special Development Works (SDW) headed by Brigadier Mohammed Sarfaraz. As a military intellectual, he played an important role in the nuclear policy of Pakistan. In March 1983, the first experiment of a cold-test of a nuclear device was headed by Ishfaq Ahmad and Munir Ahmad Khan. All they needed next was some fissile material and they would have had an atomic bomb, as pointed out by Houston Wood, Professor of Mechanical & Aerospace Engineering, University of Virginia, Charlottesville, USA in his article on gas centrifuges. O'Brian was one of the senior military officials who eye-witnessed the first cold test of a nuclear device. For his services, he was conferred with civil awards, and O'Brian took honorary retirement from the Pakistan Air Force in 1984, and joined the National Defence University, Islamabad, as a professor of War and Strategic studies. 

O'Brian retired in 1994 and lived a quiet life in Islamabad, Pakistan, where he died in 2002.

See also
Rahul Dev

References

1928 births
1998 deaths
Pakistan Air Force personnel
Pakistan Air Force officers
Pakistan Air Force air marshals
Pakistani aviators
Recipients of Sitara-e-Jurat
Pakistani Christians
Military personnel from Lahore
Project-706
Chiefs of Air Staff, Pakistan
Forman Christian College alumni
Academic staff of the National Defence University, Pakistan